Thessaloniki Science Center and Technology Museum (NOESIS) is located at the outskirts of Thessaloniki, Central Macedonia, Greece.

The museum’s main objective is to offer to the public an environment that facilitates the familiarization with and the understanding of science and technology. The foundation is also actively engaged in the protection of the Greek Technological Heritage. NOESIS has a 150-seat digital planetarium, a 300-seat Cosmotheatre with the largest flat screen in Greece, a 200-seat amphitheatre, as well as a motion simulator theater with three platforms, 3-D projection, and 6-axis movement. Elena Paparizou, a Greek pop singer, filmed part of a videoclip for her song "Number One", that won the Eurovision Song Contest 2005.

History 
NOESIS was founded in 1978 as a cultural and educational non-profit organization. In 1998, the museum initiated a project that aimed at the construction of a new facility and the development of a new spectrum of activities. The project was completed successfully and the new foundation "Thessaloniki Science Center and Technology Museum - NOESIS" was established. The project had a total budget of approximately €29 million and was co-funded by the European Union, the EEA – EFTA States and the Greek government. It was designed by French architect Denis Laming.

Collection and exhibits 
The museum currently features many exhibits, including "Technology of Transportation," featuring antique car models that mark the history of automobiles. In the near future, the exhibition hall will also include an exhibit on Ancient Greek technology; also, NOESIS will be opening the Center for Creativity and Innovation, a facility for students, as well as a Techno-park.

Gallery

External links 
 

Museums in Thessaloniki
Science museums in Greece
Technology museums in Greece
Planetaria in Greece
Modernist architecture in Greece